Riot Baby is a science fiction novella written by Nigerian-American author Tochi Onyebuchi.

Plot

Awards

References

External links
 Riot Baby on ISFDB

English-language novels
Nigerian science fiction novels
2020 American novels
American science fiction novels
American novellas
Works by Tochi Onyebuchi
2020 Nigerian novels
World Fantasy Award for Best Novella winners
Tor Books books